Le Rêve de Rico  is a 2001 film.

Synopsis 
Rico, 11, wakes up early to study for an exam. Today he has to pass the CPE, the exam that, in Mauritius, will get him into High school. He gets on the bus, but unfortunately, it breaks down. So he grabs a ride on a truck, but a fire brings traffic to a standstill. A neighbor offers to take him in his car. He's on his way, but fate has other plans...

External links 

2001 films
French drama short films
Mauritian short films
2000s French films